Marco Franceschini (born 7 April 1960) is an Italian racing cyclist. He rode in the 1983 Tour de France.

References

External links
 

1960 births
Living people
Italian male cyclists
Place of birth missing (living people)
People from La Spezia
Sportspeople from the Province of La Spezia
Cyclists from Liguria